Walter Dießl (born 14 April 1943) is an Austrian athlete. He competed in the men's decathlon at the 1968 Summer Olympics.

References

1943 births
Living people
Athletes (track and field) at the 1968 Summer Olympics
Austrian decathletes
Olympic athletes of Austria
Sportspeople from Linz